East High School, or  Sioux City East High School, is a public high school located in Sioux City, Iowa. It is one of three high schools in the Sioux City Community School District, and is fed by East Middle School, Nodland Elementary School, Sunnyside Elementary School, Morningside Elementary School, Spalding Park Elementary School, and Unity Elementary School.

History
Sioux City East High School was founded in 1920 and its original location was on Morningside Avenue just across the street from Morningside College. In 1972, the Sioux City Community School district put in the plan to build three brand new high schools for all three public schools. East then moved to Mayhew Avenue, which is located by the Southern Hills Mall in Sioux City. East was one of three other public schools to be founded in Sioux City along with Leeds, Riverside, and Central high schools. The private school in Sioux City at that time was Trinity and Cathedral high schools which now make up Bishop Heelan High School. Trinity primarily consisted of all male and Cathedral was all female. Sioux City East is the only High School in Sioux City to remain in its original state. Riverside became what is now Sioux City West and Central became Sioux City North. East has also kept its same mascot, the Black Raider since its existence. However, because of restrictions on their logo, East had to change their logo from a native war like figure to a Raider who more resembled a Knight.

Athletics 
The Black Raiders compete in the Missouri River Conference for both boys and girls sports.

Baseball 
Basketball
 Boys' 2-time State Champions (1934, 2002)
Bowling
Cross Country 
Football
 1984 Class 4A State Champions
Golf 
Soccer 
Softball 
Swimming 
Tennis
Track and Field 
 Boys' 1945 State Champions
Volleyball 
Wrestling

Performing arts

Vocal music
The Vocal Music Program at East High School offers ten choral ensembles, providing a variety of opportunities including modern a cappella and show choir. The Choirs at East present four concerts each year in addition to an authentic Renaissance Madrigal Dinner every December. While under the direction of Paula Keeler, East High School earned the distinction of being the first (and, to this day, one of the only) to place 28 singers (the maximum in Iowa) in the All-State Chorus. The premier ensemble, the Chamber Choir has performed in some of our country's finest performance venues, including four appearances at New York City's Carnegie Hall. They have earned awards at competitions throughout the country, including Grand Champion, Best Choral Tone, and Best Repertoire at FAME Los Angeles (2008), Best Repertoire and First Runner-Up at FAME Chicago (2010), Grand Champion, Best Soprano, Alto, Tenor, and Bass Sections at the Grand River Concert Choir Competition (2012), First Runner-Up at FAME Chicago (2014), and Grand Champion, Best Choral Tone, and Best Repertoire at Heart Of America-Cincinnati (2017). In 2013, they were a featured ensemble in the University of South Dakota's Vocal Arts Festival; and in 2016, they participated in Morningside College's Choral Composition Competition Festival, where the work they performed ("A Prep-School Boy" by Joshua Fishbein) received First Prize.

Since 2013, East has collaborated with neighboring Bishop Heelan, North, and West high schools in producing an annual Men's Choir Festival entitled "Man Up & Sing." Since its inception, the festival has featured guest ensembles including the Iowa Statesmen, the Great Northern Union, and the Wartburg College Ritterchor. Each year, the festival involves roughly 120 students from the four high schools along with guest ensembles and conductors.

Sioux City East is nationally recognized for its competitive Show Choir program, consisting of three ensembles: “Premiere” (JV female), “New Sound” (JV mixed), and “The Headliners” (varsity mixed). Since 1989, The Headliners have garnered nearly 50 Grand Champion awards and innumerable awards for Best Vocals, Best Choreography, and Best Band. In 2010, they were recognized by Parade Magazine as one of America's Top 25 Show Choirs, eventually advancing to the Top 3, alongside Chantilly High School's “Touch of Class” (Chantilly, VA) and Preble High School's “Center Stage” (Green Bay, WI). In 2011, they appeared in choreographer Mike Weaver's book, “Sweat, Tears, and Jazz Hands: The Official History of Show Choir from Vaudeville to Glee.”

Notable alumni
Stanley L. Greigg, former mayor of Sioux City and Iowa State Representative.
Cele Hahn
Noah Holcomb, cyclist 
Shelby Houlihan, runner 
J. D. Scholten, politician 
Bob Scott, longest serving mayor of Sioux City.
Dom Thompson-Williams, baseball player

See also
 List of high schools in Iowa

References

 East High School Website (2012)
 Black Raiders Home Page
 "Sioux City East High School", MaxPreps (2012)
 ShowChoir.com

External links
 
 Sports home page
 MaxPreps
 Show Choir
 EHS Vocal Music

1920 establishments in Iowa
Educational institutions established in 1920
Public high schools in Iowa
Schools in Sioux City, Iowa